The 1981 BC Lions finished in third place in the West Division with a 10–6 record.

Joe Paopao had an excellent season with 3777 yards passing and 28 passing touchdowns and running back Larry Key had 19 touchdowns in a bounceback season after missing most of the 1980 season due to injury. Wideout Ty Gray had a breakout season with 1428 yards receiving.

The Lions beat Winnipeg in the West Semi-Final, but fell to the Eskimos 22-16 in the Western Final when Warren Moon hit Brian Kelly for a late 4th quarter touchdown.  The Western Final included a game changing officiating error involving a Devon Ford kickoff return for a Lions touchdown when the officials incorrectly stated he stepped out-of-bounds. Television replays showed he clearly did not step out-of-bounds (video replay was instituted 25 years later in 2006).

Running back Larry Key and centre Al Wilson made the CFL all-star team.

This season marked the first time in Lions history that every regular season (16 in all) and playoff game (2) was televised.

Offseason

CFL Draft

Preseason

Regular season

Season standings

Season schedule

Playoffs

West Semi-Final

West Final

Offensive leaders

Awards and records

1981 CFL All-Stars
RB – Larry Key, CFL All-Star
C – Al Wilson, CFL All-Star

1981 CFL Western All-Stars
RB – Larry Key, CFL Western All-Star
WR – Tyrone Grey, CFL All-Star
C – Al Wilson, CFL Western All-Star

References

BC Lions seasons
1981 Canadian Football League season by team
1981 in British Columbia